Flores Costa Cuca is a town and municipality in the Quetzaltenango department of Guatemala. The municipality covers an area of 61.1 km2, is situated at an average altitude of 540 metres above sea level and has a population of 21,630.

References

Municipalities of the Quetzaltenango Department